Trachysma is a genus of sea snails, marine gastropod molluscs in the family Pendromidae.

Species
Species within the genus Trachysma include:

 Trachysma ignobile Thiele, 1912
 Trachysma antarctica Numanami, 1996
 Trachysma tenue Thiele, 1912

References

Pendromidae